Black power is a political slogan and a name for various associated ideologies aimed at achieving self-determination for people of African descent.

Black Power may also refer to:

Activism and politics
 The Black Power movement, a political movement to achieve a form of Black Power in the second half of the 20th century in the US
 The Black Power Revolution, an attempt in Trinidad and Tobago to force socio-political change in 1970

Other uses
 Black Power (album), a 1994 release by Ralph Carney, Daved Hild, and Kramer
 Black Power (New Zealand gang), a prominent gang in New Zealand
 Black Power: The Politics of Liberation, a 1967 book by Kwame Ture (then known as Stokely Carmichael) and Charles V. Hamilton
 The Black Power Mixtape 1967-1975, a 2011 documentary film by Göran Olsson about the Black Power movement in the US

See also
 1968 Olympics Black Power salute
 1972 Olympics Black Power salute
 Black Consciousness Movement, in South Africa
 Black Lives Matter, a decentralised worldwide movement starting in 2013
 Black movement in Brazil, a generic name covering 20th century social movements in Brazil
 Black Power and the American Myth
 Black power fist
 Black Power Flower
 Black supremacism
 From Black Power to Hip Hop
Negroes with Guns: Rob Williams and Black Power